Gustavo "Tavo" Kupinski (18 January 1974 – 4 January 2011) was an Argentine guitarist, member of the rock band Los Piojos. He was born in Buenos Aires. During his career, he integrated a band called Revelados, and was guitarist of Las Pelotas. He was killed in an accident in Dolores, Buenos Aires.

Discography

References

External links

1974 births
2011 deaths
People from Buenos Aires
Argentine people of Polish descent
Argentine musicians
Argentine guitarists
Argentine male guitarists
Argentine rock musicians
Road incident deaths in Argentina
Argentine bandoneonists
Burials at La Chacarita Cemetery
20th-century guitarists
20th-century Argentine musicians
21st-century guitarists
21st-century Argentine musicians
20th-century male musicians
21st-century male musicians